Palinuro is a town in the Province of Salerno, Italy.

Palinuro may also refer to:
 Cape Palinuro, Campania, Italy
 Italian training ship Palinuro
 Volcano Palinuro, off the coast of Cilento in Southern Italy
 Palinuro de México, a 1976 novel by Mexican author Fernando del Paso

See also
 Palinure (disambiguation)
 Palinurus (disambiguation)